Peperomia vallensis is a species of herb and epiphyte in the Peperomia genus. It mostly grows in wet tropical biomes. Specimens can be at an altitude of 100–2320.

Etymology
vallensis came from the Spanish word for valley.

Distribution
Peperomia vallensis can only be found in 2 countries, Colombia and Ecuador.

Colombia
Antioquia
Valle del Cauca
Ecuador

References

vallensis
Flora of Colombia
Flora of Ecuador
Plants described in 1929
Taxa named by William Trelease
Taxa named by Truman G. Yuncker